Norman Bailey Snead (born July 31, 1939) is an American former professional football player who was a quarterback in the National Football League (NFL). He played for the Washington Redskins, Philadelphia Eagles, Minnesota Vikings, New York Giants, and San Francisco 49ers. He played college football for Wake Forest University and was drafted in the first round with the second overall pick of the 1961 NFL Draft.

Early life
Snead grew up in Newport News, Virginia, the son of Hugh, a farmer, and Louise Snead. He attended Warwick High School, where he was a star three-sport (basketball, football and baseball) athlete. Snead won all six pitching decisions as a sophomore and junior, and he averaged 23 points in basketball as a senior, scoring 41 in one game. He split time as starting quarterback as a junior, then as a senior he passed for nearly 1,000 yards and 13 touchdowns. In a game against Hampton, Snead threw what would be the game-winning touchdown pass, then intercepted a pass on Hampton's next series to seal the outcome. He was named second-team all-state. He graduated in 1957.

College career
Snead went to Wake Forest University, where he set 15 conference single-games, season and career passing records. His passing statistics with the Demon Deacons included:
1958: 67-151 for 1,003 yards.
1959: 82-191 for 1,361 yards.
1960: 123-259 for 1,676 yards.

In 1958, Snead was named the second-team All-Atlantic Coast Conference quarterback, and in 1959 and 1960 he earned first-team All-ACC honors. In 1960, Snead was named second-team All-American as a quarterback by UPI and the Football Writers Association of America.

In 1984, he was inducted into the Virginia Sports Hall of Fame.

NFL career
Snead was named to the Pro Bowl on four occasions: in 1962, 1963, 1965, and in 1972, during the last of which he led the NFL in completion percentage and was second in passer rating.

Snead was drafted by both the National Football League and the American Football League, and Snead elected to join the Redskins, who drafted him as the 2nd overall pick. Unfortunately, the team was in the middle of a dark age, as they had not had a winning season since 1956 nor made a playoff game since 1946. Starting with a new coach in Bill McPeak, Snead would start in each game for 1961, which proved to a miserable one. Snead would have three games with at least three interceptions as the team did not win a game until the season finale against the up-start Dallas Cowboys. Snead threw eleven touchdowns to 22 interceptions for 2,337 yards. He was in the top ten for pass attempts, completions, yards, and interceptions (3rd, 4th, 6th and 3rd, respectively). Snead would improve slightly for the next season, as he would throw for 2,926 yards with 22 touchdowns and interceptions as he won five games for the Redskins, and it was good enough for a selection to the Pro Bowl. The next season was his last, and it was a miserable one. In a 3-11 season, he threw for 3,043 yards (the first of two 3,000-yard seasons) while throwing 13 touchdowns and 27 interceptions (a league high), but he was nevertheless selected to the Pro Bowl once again. His highlight game in yards came against the Pittsburgh Steelers, as he threw for 424 yards for the only 400-yard game of his career in a 34-28 loss. After the season, he was moved to the Philadelphia Eagles for Sonny Jurgensen and Claude Crabb.

In seven seasons, Snead was the primary starter for each season (starting 81 of 98 possible games), although the result would be that Snead was part of another team in a decades-long slump. Snead started the first nine games of the season before starting one of the final five games. He threw for 1,096 yards while throwing fourteen touchdowns to twelve interceptions as the Eagles won six games. The Eagles continued their spin in 1965, as Snead started ten games and won four while throwing 2,346 yards for fifteen touchdowns to thirteen interceptions and garnered a Pro Bowl selection.

For 1966, he went 5-5 but the Eagles won four games without him as starter to finish 2nd in their division. It was the first of just three seasons that Snead would play on a team with a winning season. The game against the St. Louis Cardinals was the worst of his career, as he threw a career high five interceptions while going 16-of-45 for 247 yards. He threw eight touchdowns to eleven interceptions for 1,275 yards (throwing for over 200 yards just once in his starts). In 1967, he returned to start each game and threw 29 touchdowns to 24 interceptions while going for 3,399 yards (a career high) as the team went 6-7-1. However, the next three seasons were a return to misery, as he won just nine of his 35 starts and was outmatched in interceptions to touchdowns each time. He led the league in interceptions twice during that span. However, Snead was traded away after the 1970 season, going to a growing power in Minnesota, who at that time had just Gary Cuozzo as quarterback. He was traded from the Eagles to the Vikings for Steve Smith, second- and sixth-round selections in 1971 (50th and 154th overall–Hank Allison and Mississippi defensive back Wyck Neely respectively) and a 1972 third-round pick (76th overall–Bobby Majors) on January 28, 1971. He made appearances at quarterback for seven games while starting two of them. While he would throw six interceptions to one touchdown for 470 yards, he ended up winning both of his starts (against Buffalo and Philadelphia). Although the Vikings made the playoffs, Cuozzo was the starter for the playoff game against Dallas while Snead was on the sideline. It was the only time Snead was on a playoff roster.

He was dealt along with Bob Grim, Vince Clements, a first rounder in 1972 (24th overall–Larry Jacobson) and a second rounder in 1973 (40th overall–Brad Van Pelt) from the Vikings to the Giants for Fran Tarkenton one year later on January 27, 1972; this made him one of few quarterbacks to be part of two trades for eventual Hall of Fame quarterbacks. Snead would start in 13 of 14 games for the Giants in 1972, and it was his last good run. He threw for 2,307 yards while leading the league in completion percentage (60.3%) while throwing 17 touchdowns to 12 interceptions, the first time he had more touchdowns than interceptions since 1967. The Giants went 8-5 after losing two of their last three games. It proved to be a mirage for the Giants, since the team went 1-5-1 with Snead as starter the following year. He led the league in interceptions with 22 while throwing for 1,483 yards. He would start four games for the Giants the following year before being traded to San Francisco, where he made one start. The trade on October 22, 1974 began a chain reaction of quarterback trades, where Snead was sent from the Giants to the San Francisco 49ers for a third rounder in 1975 (62nd overall–Danny Buggs) and a fourth rounder in 1976 (104th overall–Gordon Bell). He dislodged Joe Reed who went from the 49ers to the Detroit Lions and was replaced by Craig Morton who was acquired by the Giants from the Dallas Cowboys.

In 1975, he started seven games for the 49ers. Going 2-5, he threw 1,337 yards for nine touchdowns to ten interceptions. After being cut by the 49ers in the 1976 preseason, he re-signed with the Giants to replace the injured Jerry Golsteyn as Morton's backup on September 1, and he would make two starts. Snead would take part in one of the strangest wins ever for a quarterback. The winless Giants (0-8) faced 6-3 Washington on November 14, and the two teams combined for just 179 yards of passing to go with seven turnovers. Snead went 3-of-14 for two interceptions and 26 yards for a passer rating of 0, but Joe Danelo broke the tie with his 50 yard field goal in the fourth quarter to win the game 12-9. Snead is the last quarterback to win a game with a passer rating of zero. It was also his last appearance in the NFL.

Snead was the first quarterback to have lost 100 games as a starter. Since then, only seven other quarterbacks (including three Hall of Famers) have lost as many games. Snead appeared or started in 178 games and threw at least one interception in 131 of them.

Coaching career
Snead retired from playing in 1977 and was hired as the head football coach at The Apprentice School in Newport News, Virginia. He served two stints as head football coach, from 1977 to 1984 and 1988 to 1989, compiling a record of was 46–41–2.

References

External links
 

1939 births
Living people
American football quarterbacks
The Apprentice Builders football coaches
Minnesota Vikings players
New York Giants players
Philadelphia Eagles players
San Francisco 49ers players
Wake Forest Demon Deacons football players
Washington Redskins players
Eastern Conference Pro Bowl players
National Conference Pro Bowl players
People from Halifax County, Virginia
Players of American football from Virginia
People from Newport News, Virginia